Blackthorn Winter, in rural England a spell of cold weather in spring or early summer, may refer to:

 Blackthorn Winter (Reiss novel), a 2006 novel by Kathryn Reiss
 Blackthorn Winter (Wilson novel), a 2003 novel by Douglas Wilson